David Colin Alex Delany (born 28 December 1997) is an Irish cricketer. He made his Twenty20 cricket debut for Munster Reds in the 2017 Inter-Provincial Trophy on 16 June 2017. He made his first-class debut for Leinster Lightning in the 2017 Inter-Provincial Championship on 5 September 2017. He made his List A debut for Leinster Lightning in the 2017 Inter-Provincial Cup on 10 September 2017.

In August 2018, he was named in Ireland's squad for the limited overs series against Afghanistan, but he did not play. In September 2019, he was named in Ireland's Twenty20 International (T20I) squad for the 2019–20 Ireland Tri-Nation Series. He made his T20I debut for Ireland, against Scotland, on 17 September 2019.

In December 2020, Delany was named in Ireland's One Day International (ODI) squad for their tour to the UAE to play the United Arab Emirates and Afghanistan. However, in January 2021, Delany was ruled out of the tour due to a knee injury. Since his knee injury, Delany has coached at Muir College in South Africa, and played in a local cricket league.

References

External links
 

1997 births
Living people
Irish cricketers
Ireland Twenty20 International cricketers
Munster Reds cricketers
Leinster Lightning cricketers
Northern Knights cricketers
Cricketers from Dublin (city)